Juan Suárez Carvajal (1485 – October 6, 1584) was a Roman Catholic prelate who served as Bishop of Lugo (1539–1561).

Biography
Juan Suárez Carvajals was born in Talavera de la Reina, Spain, in 1485.
On September 9, 1539, he was selected by the King of Spain and confirmed by Pope Paul III as Bishop of Lugo. 
On March 10, 1561 he retired from his position as bishop and he died on October 6, 1584.

While bishop, he was the principal consecrator of Bernardino de Carmona, Auxiliary Bishop of Santiago de Compostela (1553).

References

External links and additional sources
 (for Chronology of Bishops) 
 (for Chronology of Bishops) 

1485 births
1584 deaths
Bishops appointed by Pope Paul III